Răucești is a commune in Neamț County, Western Moldavia, Romania. It is composed of four villages: Oglinzi, Răucești, Săvești and Ungheni.

References

Communes in Neamț County
Localities in Western Moldavia